The 1949 Mexicana DC-3 crash was an aviation accident on September 26, 1949, when a Mexicana de Aviacion Douglas DC-3 en route to Benito Juarez International Airport in Mexico City, Mexico crashed into the Popocatepetl volcano, killing all 23 people on board. The aircraft, registered as XA-DUH, was flying from Tapachula on a route that originated in Tuxtla Gutierrez with intermediate stops in Ixtepec and Oaxaca. The dead included actress Blanca Estela Pavón and senator Gabriel Ramos Millan. 

The DC-3's pilot was identified as Alfonso Reboul Lasscassies.

Accident
The DC-3 left Tapachula at 12:40 local time, for a one hour flight. According to investigations, the DC-3 flying the route that day faced severe turbulence as it arrived over Mexico City. The  pilot communicated with an air force base, telling them they were near the volcano.

The airplane was completely destroyed.

Other information
The famous Mexican writer and later politician, Andrés Henestrosa, was supposed to be on the flight with his friend, senator Ramos Millan. Henestrosa had a premonition and he boarded a train to Mexico City instead.

See also
 List of accidents and incidents involving commercial aircraft

References 

Mexicana de Aviación accidents and incidents
Aviation accidents and incidents in Mexico
Aviation accidents and incidents involving controlled flight into terrain
Accidents and incidents involving the Douglas DC-3
September 1949 events in Mexico